The Moldovan National Army is the senior branch of the Armed Forces of the Republic of Moldova composed of the Air Force and the Land Forces. The National Army is considered to be the regular duty military force while the other branch of the armed forces, the Trupele de Carabinieri, is focused on paramilitary activities.

History

The National Army was officially established on 3 September 1991 on the basis of the Soviet Army's 14th Guards Army. In early 1994, the ground forces of the National Army consisted of 9,800 soldiers, organized into three motorized brigades, an artillery brigade, and a reconnaissance battalion. The General Staff was established on 24 April 1994 by the decision of the Government of Moldova. In 2007, at the behest of President Vladimir Voronin, the number of Moldovan National Army servicemen was reduced from 8,500 to 6,500 as a result of a rapid reform that was in response to concerns from Transnistria over a potential conflict. The National Army has been participating in the Joint Combined Exchange Training of the United States Armed Forces since 2009. The cooperation protocol between the National Army and the International Committee of the Red Cross was signed in Chisinau in 2016. On 3 October 2017, President Igor Dodon became the first Moldovan leader to hold a working meeting with commanders of units in the National Army. Earlier that September, Dodon had banned the participation of National Army servicemen in exercises abroad without his consent. In early 2020, Defence Minister Victor Gaiciuc signed an agreement with Bishop Vladimir (Cantarean) of the Moldovan Orthodox Church on religious cooperation with the National Army. 
By 2021, all conscription requirements for the National Army are planned to be fulfilled in order for the country to transfer from compulsory military service to soldiers being hired on a contract basis. 

During the 2021-2022 fiscal year, Moldova increased military spending by more than 150 percent.

General Staff

The General Staff planning combat and training activities and improves the mobilization capacity of troops as well as operational combat and mobilization training. It is the main body that ensures a Supreme Command that is led by the President of the Republic who is also the Supreme Commander of the Armed Forces. The position of Chief of the General Staff of the National Army (Marelui Stat Major al Armatei Republicii Moldova) executes the paramount leadership of the troops through the army commands. He/she assists the Minister of Defense and the President in commanding the National Army. The first one was Colonel Pavel Chirău, who took office in April 1994. In wartime situations, the Chief of the General Staff becomes the de facto First Deputy Supreme Commander-in-Chief of the Armed Forces should the Minister of Defense be a civilian.

Structure
 General Staff (J1)
 Personnel Directorate (J2)
 Operations Directorate (J3)
 Directorate of Logistics (J4)
 Strategic Planning Directorate (J5)
 Communication and Information Systems Directorate (J6)
 Center of Communications and Informatics
 Doctrine and Joint Training Directorate (J7)
 Management, Coordination and Monitoring Directorate
 Law Department
 Health Department
 Economic and Financial Department
 Secretariat and Internal Management Department
 Legal Department
 Human Resources Management Department
 Defense Policy and Defense Planning Division
 General Inspection Directorate
 Public Relations Service
 General Staff Regiment "Brigadier General Nicolae Petrică"
 Military police

Operations Directorate
The J3 Operations Directorate develops operational plans on the engagement of the National Army during peacetime and crisis situations.

Logistics Directorate
The Directorate of Logistics implements policies issued by the Ministry of Defence concerning logistic support. It also manages, monitors and organises the distribution of material goods for troops. It has centralized archive of the record of weapons, military equipment, and ammunition.

Military Police
The Military Police Section has duties that include operative coordination, on the monitoring and protection of military personnel, guarding military installations, ensuring military discipline and order. It also controls the direction of the military car technique in road traffic.

Cyber Incident Response Center
The Cyber Incident Response Center of the National Army of the Republic of Moldova was established in early 2021 with NATO support. Defense Minister Victor Gaiciuc, said it "will increase the Ministry of Defence’s posture and capacity to respond to cyber threats".

Military areas
National Army garrisons are located in the following cities: Chisinau, Balti, Cahul and Ungheni. A military proving ground is located in Bulboaca, Anenii Noi. It is the largest of its kind in the Republic of Moldova, with an area of 21 kilometers. There are several specialized sectors on the territory of the base, where the military carries out both daily exercises and preparations for multinational applications. Within the military base, training that is done includes throwing hand grenades, planting mines, chemical protection training (NBC) and providing first aid. Other installations are usually Military Camps (Tabăra Militară) and can be found all over the country, such as Military Camp 142 and Military Camp 123.

Associations
The National Army Commanding Officer Corps is the official organization in the National Army that serves all of its commissioned officers. The National Army Women’s Association (NAWA) is an extracurricular association that offers support to National Army's female military and civilian personnel. It was established on 28 February 2019 and was launched on 7 June 2019 in the presence of Minister of Defense Eugen Sturza and Deputy Prime Minister for Reintegration Cristina Lesnic. The NAWA consists of 37 officers led by its president, Colonel Mariana Grama. On 24 January 2020, the first meeting of the National Council for War Veterans Affairs since its creation was held in the capital in the presence of Prime Minister Ion Chicu.

Traditions
Currently, the Honor Guard Company is the only unit in the armed forces to utilize the goose step. Outside of the company, the regular army uses a Romanian style march step. This was established in 2011 by order of Defense Minister Vitalie Marinuța in time for the Chișinău Independence Day Parade. The formula was considered to be a new, more NATO-style marching formula, done to "preserve the health" of servicemen.
Since 2020, a formal flag-raising military ceremony has been held at all military installations.
The Defense Minister’s Cup is a skills and sports competition held yearly for National Army service members.

National Army Day
On 2 September, the National Army marks its professional own holiday, Ziua Armatei Naționale (Day of the National Army). The President of Moldova and the Prime Minister of Moldova usually present congratulations and decorations to all active and veteran servicemen. The Ministry of Defense usually organizes large demonstrations on the holiday. Military officials lay flowers at the Stephen the Great Monument and the Eternity Memorial Complex. Festive activities are also organized in local cities. In 2018, the National Army Day silver jubilee celebrations were held by the 1st Motorized Infantry Brigade "Moldova" in Bălți.

In popular culture
The project "24 Hours in the National Army" is a media event involving representatives of 12 media Moldovan media institutions. The project is organized by Mass-media information and communication service, together with Special Forces Battalion at the National Army Military Training Centre from Bulboaca. It has been attended by representatives of national and regional media institutions such as PRO TV, Moldova 1, and TVR Moldova. The first edition of the project was organized in 2006.

See also
Belarusian Ground Forces
Ukrainian Ground Forces
Romanian Army

References

External links
Ministry of Defence of the Republic of Moldova
MDNationalArmy